Iranocichla is a genus of fish in the family Cichlidae found in fresh and brackish waters in southern Iran. They are the only cichlids native to this country.

Species
There are currently two described species in this genus, but a third population of unclear affinities is known from the Kol River drainage (between the range of the two recognized species):
 Iranocichla hormuzensis Coad, 1982
 Iranocichla persa Esmaeili, Sayyadzadeh & Seehausen, 2016

References

 
Oreochromini
Taxa named by Brian W. Coad
Freshwater fish genera